Hubert Carter (1869–1934) was an English stage and film actor.

Selected filmography
 Ivanhoe (1913)
 The Wonderful Year (1921)
 The House of Peril (1922)
 A Gipsy Cavalier (1922)
 The Game of Life (1922)
 Blinkeyes (1926)
 London (1926)
 The House of Unrest (1931)

References

Bibliography
 Goble, Alan. The Complete Index to Literary Sources in Film. Walter de Gruyter, 1999.

External links

1869 births
1934 deaths
English male film actors
English male silent film actors
20th-century English male actors
English male stage actors
Male actors from Bradford